The Rural Municipality of Prairie Lakes is a rural municipality (RM) in the Canadian province of Manitoba. 
The Rural Municipality of Prairies lakes surrounds most of the north end of Pelican Lake. There are several other lakes in the RM such as Grass Lake, Overend Lake, Bone Lake, Lorne Lake, Louise Lake, Lloyds Lake, Noble Lake and many more that are all much smaller than Pelican Lake.

History

Rural Municipality of Riverside was originally incorporated as a rural municipality on December 22, 1883.

Rural Municipality of Strathcona was originally incorporated as a rural municipality in April 1906.

The Rural Municipality of Prairie Lakes was created on January 1, 2015 via the amalgamation of the RMs of Strathcona and Riverside. It was formed as a requirement of The Municipal Amalgamations Act, which required that municipalities with a population less than 1,000 amalgamate with one or more neighbouring municipalities by 2015. The Government of Manitoba initiated these amalgamations in order for municipalities to meet the 1997 minimum population requirement of 1,000 to incorporate a municipality.

Geography

Communities 
 Belmont
 Margaret
 Ninette

Climate 

Information listed below is from Environment Canada Belmont Weather station

Demographics 

See also 
Pelican Lake
 RM of Killarney-Turtle Mountain

References 

2015 establishments in Manitoba
Manitoba municipal amalgamations, 2015
Populated places established in 2015
Rural municipalities in Manitoba